William Aloysius McGowan (January 18, 1896 – December 9, 1954) was an American umpire in Major League Baseball who worked in the American League from 1925 to 1954. McGowan founded the second umpire school in the United States. He was inducted into the National Baseball Hall of Fame in 1992, the first person born in Delaware so honored.

Early life and career
McGowan was born and grew up in Wilmington, Delaware. In 1913, he began umpiring in the Tri-State League at the age of 17. He moved on to the Virginia League in 1915, the International League and New York State League in 1916, and the Blue Ridge League in 1917. McGowan served in the United States Armed Forces during World War I in 1918, and then returned to the International League for 1919. Following the 1922 season, McGowan left the International League and joined the umpiring staff of the Southern Association, staying there until 1924.

Major league baseball
On April 14, 1925, McGowan umpired his first American League game, a Boston Red Sox-Philadelphia Athletics game at Shibe Park. He umpired third base in that game. He would umpire for 30 seasons, umpiring in eight World Series (1928, 1931, 1935, 1939, 1941, 1944, 1947, and 1950). He also worked four All-Star Games (1933, 1937, 1942, and 1950). He umpired in 2,541 consecutive games, missing a game on September 3, 1940, due to neuritis.

Off the field
McGowan spent time writing baseball-related newspaper articles in the offseasons, working for the New Orleans Item in the 1920s. McGowan founded what is now known as the Wendelstedt Umpire School in 1938, which was run by Al Somers after his death until 1977, when it was taken over by the Wendelstedt family.

Death
He died at age 58 at his home in Silver Spring, Maryland, after suffering two heart attacks in less than a week. He was buried in Cathedral Cemetery in Wilmington. He was survived by his wife, a son and a foster son. McGowan was elected to the Baseball Hall of Fame in 1992 by the Veterans Committee.

Ted Williams called McGowan "Number 1," considering him the best umpire of his playing days.

See also 

 List of Major League Baseball umpires

References

Further reading

External links

Retrosheet

1896 births
1954 deaths
Major League Baseball umpires
National Baseball Hall of Fame inductees
People from Silver Spring, Maryland
Sportspeople from Wilmington, Delaware